is a passenger railway station in the city of Takasaki, Gunma, Japan, operated by the private railway operator Jōshin Dentetsu.

Lines

Station layout
The station consists of a single side platform serving traffic in both directions. It is unattended.

Adjacent stations

History
Nishi-Yoshii Station opened on 15 December 1971.

Surrounding area

Yoshii-Nagane Post Office

See also
 List of railway stations in Japan

External links

 official homepage 
  Burari-Gunma 

Railway stations in Gunma Prefecture
Railway stations in Japan opened in 1971
Takasaki, Gunma